Mellisugini is one of the three tribes that make up the subfamily Trochilinae in the hummingbird family Trochilidae. The other two tribes in the subfamily are Lampornithini (mountain gems) and Trochilini (emeralds).

The informal name "bees" has been proposed for this group as it includes the tiny bee hummingbird (Mellisuga helenae) that is endemic to Cuba.

The tribe contains 37 species divided into 16 genera.

Phylogeny
A molecular phylogenetic study of the hummingbirds published in 2007 found that the family was composed of nine major clades. When Edward Dickinson and James Van Remsen, Jr. updated the Howard and Moore Complete Checklist of the Birds of the World for the 4th edition in 2013 they based their classification on these results and placed three of the nine clades in the subfamily Trochilinae. The clades were placed in separate tribes which they named Mellisugini (bees), Lampornithini (mountain gems) and Trochilini (emeralds). The tribe Mellisugini with the current circumscription was introduced in 2009. A subfamily Mellisuginae had been introduced by the German naturalist Ludwig Reichenbach in 1854.

Molecular phylogenetic studies by Jimmy McGuire and collaborators published between 2007 and 2014 determined the relationships between the major groups of hummingbirds. In the cladogram below the English names are those introduced in 1997. The Latin names are those proposed by Dickinson and Remsen in 2013.

The cladogram below shows the relationships between the genera and is based on a molecular phylogenetic study by Yuyini Licona-Vera and Juan Francisco Ornelas published in 2017. The results are in agreement with the phylogeny by Jimmy McGuire and collaborators published in 2014.

The genus Calliphlox was found to be polyphyletic. As part of the revised classification to create monophyletic genera, the Bahama woodstar and the Inagua woodstar were moved to the resurrected genus Nesophlox. Later, the genus Philodice was resurrected to accommodate the purple-throated woodstar and the amethyst woodstar.

The genus Atthis containing the wine-throated hummingbird and the bumblebee hummingbird was embedded within Selasphorus. The genera were therefore merged and as under the rules of the International Code of Zoological Nomenclature Selasphorus has priory over Atthis the two species were moved to Selasphorus.

Distinguishing features
The males of most species in the tribe Mellisugini have specialized tail feathers that produce sounds during their courtship display. This is not restricted to this tribe as males in the genus Discosura belonging to the tribe Lesbiini (coquettes) can also produce sounds from their tail feathers.

Most of the migratory hummingbirds are found in this tribe. Remarkable examples are the rufous hummingbird (Selasphorus rufus) that breeds as far north as western Canada and Alaska and overwinters in Mexico and the ruby-throated hummingbird (Archilochus colubris) that breeds in the eastern United States and then crosses the Gulf of Mexico to winter in Mexico and Central America. There are five other long-distance migrants in the tribe: the broad-tailed hummingbird (Selasphorus platycercus), the calliope hummingbird (Selasphorus calliope), Allen's hummingbird (Selasphorus sasin), the black-chinned hummingbird (Archilochus alexandri) and the lucifer sheartail (Calothorax lucifer). It is likely that migratory behaviour has evolved several times.

Taxonomic list
The tribe contains 17 genera.

References

Sources

 

Bird tribes